8 is the eighth studio album by American rock band Incubus. It was released on April 21, 2017, through Island Records. The album takes its name from being the band's eighth LP. The release of 8 in 2017 saw the longest time between full-length albums for Incubus. The album was previously produced by Dave Sardy, and later re-produced and mixed by Skrillex, a close friend of the band. The album's first single, "Nimble Bastard", peaked at number 4 on the Billboard Mainstream Rock Songs chart in April 2017.

Background
The writing for 8 began at the end of 2015, when the band was putting together Side B of their Trust Fall EP. However, with the amount of quality content they were producing, they decided to release an LP instead. Recording took place throughout 2016 and 2017, with production and remixing occurring throughout the cycle, including a few weeks before the final release. This was due to Skrillex's late involvement with the project.

Critical reception

8 received mixed reviews from music critics. At Metacritic, which assigns a normalized rating out of 100 to reviews from mainstream critics, the album has an average score of 45 based on 7 reviews, indicating "mixed or average reviews".

Many listeners praised the band's return to rock with tracks like "Throw Out the Map" and "No Fun", the overall quality of production, as well as Brandon Boyd's vocal range, while others criticized the lack of personality within the album.

Commercial performance
8 debuted at number four on the Billboard 200, moving 52,000 album-equivalent units; it sold 49,000 copies in its first week, with the remainder of its unit total reflecting the album's streaming activity and track sales. In the second week, the album dropped at No.127, but re-surfaced within the top 100 at No.53 in the third week.

Track listing

Personnel
Personnel as listed in the album's liner notes are:

Incubus
 Brandon Boyd – lead vocals, rhythm guitar, percussion, additional production (tracks 1, 3, 6–8, 10), art direction
 Michael Einziger – lead guitar, piano, backing vocals, string orchestration and arrangements, conducting, additional production (tracks 1, 3, 6–8, 10), additional engineering
 Jose Pasillas II – drums
 Chris Kilmore – piano, keyboards, mellotron, organ, turntables
 Ben Kenney – bass, backing vocals

Recording
Dave Sardy – production (uncredited)
Skrillex – co-production (tracks 1, 3, 5, 7), electric guitar, additional production (11), mixing (1-6, 8–9, 11)
James Monti – engineer
Cameron Barton – assistant engineer
Matt Tuggle – 2nd engineer
Bryan Dimaio – 3rd engineer
Gabe Sackier – additional engineering
Todd Hurtt – additional engineering
Gentry Studer – mastering

Artwork
Brantley Gutierrez – art direction, band photography
Alberto Erazo – design

Charts

Release history

References

2017 albums
Incubus (band) albums
Island Records albums